The 1930 U.S. National Championships (now known as the US Open) was a tennis tournament that took place on the outdoor grass courts at the West Side Tennis Club, Forest Hills in New York City, United States. The tournament ran from August 28 until September 13. It was the 50th staging of the U.S. National Championships and the fourth Grand Slam tennis event of the year.

Finals

Men's singles

 John Doeg defeated  Frank Shields  10–8, 1–6, 6–4, 16–14

Women's singles

 Betty Nuthall defeated  Anna McCune Harper  6–1, 6–4

Men's doubles
 George Lott /  John Doeg defeated  Wilmer Allison /  John Van Ryn 8–6, 6–3, 4–6, 13–15, 6–4

Women's doubles
 Betty Nuthall /  Sarah Palfrey defeated  Edith Cross /  Anna McCune Harper 3–6, 6–3, 7–5

Mixed doubles
 Edith Cross /  Wilmer Allison defeated  Marjorie Morrill /  Frank Shields 6–4, 6–4

References

External links
Official US Open website

 
U.S. National Championships
U.S. National Championships (tennis) by year
U.S. National Championships
U.S. National Championships
U.S. National Championships
U.S. National Championships